The Asipovichy Reservoir is situated by Svislach River in the Asipovichy District of Mogilev Region, Belarus.

The reservoir is created in 1953. Its primary usages are powering the Asipovichy Hydroelectric Station and watering the ponds of the Svisloch Fishery.

References

External links

Asipovichy District
Lakes of Belarus
Reservoirs built in the Soviet Union
Reservoirs in Europe